Nibelheim may refer to:

Niflheim, a region in Germanic and Norse mythology
Nibelheim or "Nibel Home", the home of the dwarves known as Nibelungs in Richard Wagner's Der Ring des Nibelungen
Nibelheim (Final Fantasy VII), the hometown of protagonists Cloud Strife and Tifa Lockhart, in the video game Final Fantasy VII